The Big Ten Conference's men's lacrosse tournament started in 2015 in the first year the conference sponsored men's lacrosse. Until 2019, the top four teams from the regular season qualified for the tournament. From 2021 tournament, all six teams advance to the tournament while top 2 teams are given a bye to the semifinals. The winner of the tournament receives the conference's automatic bid into the NCAA Men's Lacrosse Championship.

Tournament champions

Tournament history by school

References

External links
 Men's Lacrosse at BigTen.org